Tanel Tuhal (born 25 June 1967 in Pärnu) is a notable Estonian architect.

He graduated from the Department of Architecture of the State Art Institute of the Estonian SSR (today's Estonian Academy of Arts) in 1992.

Tanel Tuhal works in the architectural bureau Luhse&Tuhal OÜ.

Notable works by Tanel Tuhal include the new monastery of Pirita, the Concert Hall of Jõhvi, the apartment buildings in Lehe street and the extension of the Russian Theatre in Tallinn. Tanel Tuhal is a member of the Union of Estonian Architects.

Works
Pärnu College, 1997
123 gas station, 2000
Benedictine monastery in Pirita, 2001
Beach café in Pärnu, 2002
Apartment building in Kuressaare, 2003
Jõhvi Concert Hall, 2005
Apartment building in Rakvere, 2005
Apartment buildings on Papli Street, 2005
Extension of the Russian Theatre, 2006
Gran Rose Spa, 2006
Apartment building on Tedre Street, 2007
Apartment building on Lehe Street, 2007
Kindergarten in Jüri, 2008

See also
 List of Estonian architects

References
Union of Estonian Architects, members
Architectural Bureau Luhse&Tuhal OÜ, works

Estonian architects
1967 births
Living people
People from Pärnu
Estonian Academy of Arts alumni